Jaco Ahlers (born 19 November 1982) is a South African professional golfer who plays on the Sunshine Tour.

Professional career
Ahlers has played on the Sunshine Tour since 2006. He has won ten tournaments including the 2009 Vodacom Business Origins of Golf Tour at Erinvale, the 2014 Lion of Africa Cape Town Open, the 2015 Investec Cup, the 2016 KCM Zambia Open (winning all four in sudden-death playoffs), the 2016 Sun Wild Coast Sun Challenge, the 2016 Vodacom Origins of Golf (Euphoria), the 2018 Dimension Data Pro-Am and the 2019 King's Cup and Vodacom Origins (Selborne).

Ahlers also played on the Asian Tour in 2011 and PGA Tour Canada in 2013.

Professional wins (10)

Sunshine Tour wins (10)

*Note: The 2009 Vodacom Origins of Golf at Erinvale was shortened to 36 holes due to weather.

Sunshine Tour playoff record (5–2)

Results in major championships
Results not in chronological order in 2020.

CUT = missed the half-way cut
NT = No tournament due to COVID-19 pandemic

Results in World Golf Championships

See also
2016 European Tour Qualifying School graduates

References

External links

South African male golfers
Sunshine Tour golfers
European Tour golfers
Asian Tour golfers
People from Centurion, Gauteng
Sportspeople from Gauteng
White South African people
1982 births
Living people